20 Años (Spanish; veinte años) or 20 Anos (Portuguese: Vinte anos); (English: 20 Years) may refer to:

Music

Spanish-language albums
 
 20 Años (Gian Marco album)
 20 Años (Luis Miguel album)
 20 Años Después, compilation released 20 years after death of Victor Jara
 20 Años de Éxitos En Vivo con Moderatto, 2011 live album by Alejandra Guzmán
 20 Años, by Alejandro Lerner
 20 Años, by Extremoduro
 20 Años, by Francisco Charro Avitia
 20 Años, by Los Morros del Norte
 20 Años, by Chilean singer Nicole
 20 Años, by Siempre Así
20 Años Éxitos, by El Gran Combo
20 Años Éxitos, by Samuel Hernández

Portuguese-language albums
 20 Anos, by Ivete Sangalo
 20 Anos, by Joanna 
 20 Anos, by Quinta do Bill
 20 Anos de Sucesso, by Zezé Di Camargo & Luciano
 20 Anos de Sucesso, by To Zé Bit & Sonae

See also
 20 Years (disambiguation)